Lim Boo Chang (born 25 November 1955 in Penang, Malaysia; ; pinyin: Lín Wú Chán) is a Malaysian politician.

Educations

Politics
He was appointed to serve as a Penang Island Municipal Councillor from 1990 to 1995. He was elected and served for two consecutive terms as the Penang State Legislative Assemblyman of Datok Keramat from 1995 to 1999, and from 1999 to 2004.

Lim is the son of Datuk Lim Ee Heong, a veteran politician who helped Tun Dr Lim Chong Eu in the formation of Parti Gerakan Rakyat Malaysia (GERAKAN), which took over the Penang state government in 1969 from the then Alliance Party. He followed his father's footstep and joined GERAKAN in 1984 upon his return from United Kingdom after being called to the English Bar. Subsequently, he was elected as its National Youth Chairman and thus as ex officio vice-president of GERAKAN (1993–1996).

On 3 December 1999, he and Lim Chien Aun; who is Tun Dr Lim's son resigned from GERAKAN after they just won in the 10th 1999 Malaysian general election as its candidates to be the Penang state assemblymen five days earlier to join Malaysian Chinese Association (MCA).

In December 2002, his party membership was suspended indefinitely by MCA for abstaining in voting on the opposition party DAP's motion to suspend the controversial Penang Outer Ring Road project. The suspension was later on lifted in September 2003, a few months before the Malaysian 11th General Elections.

He resigned from MCA on 4 April 2008. He becomes a political commentator and maintaining his own blog since 19 April 2008 via www.limboochang.com. He joined the People's Justice Party (or Parti Keadilan Rakyat, PKR) with his membership officially announced by the de facto leader of that Party, Dato' Seri Anwar Ibrahim in Penang on 15 June 2008.  He was announced as the Bukit Gelugor PKR division chief in October 2010.

He resigned from PKR on 14 December 2011 over his disagreement with the party's policy in the party's policy in the Penang Island Municipal Council. He eyed to return to GERAKAN but the party was reluctant to accept him back.

Lim was one of the three founding Vice Presidents for the new Penang-based party, Malaysian United Party (MUP) established on 2 December 2016 to provide check and balance on both the ruling and opposition parties.

Books
Lim wrote two books on politics in Mandarin. One on his experience in Gerakan called "The Cross-Section" in August 1996, and the other which is based on his Master thesis on the MCA titled "Towards a Participatory Model of Political Culture- A Treatise on the MCA's Development" in July 2005.

Honour
Lim was conferred the federal award of Kesatria Mangku Negara (K.M.N.) by the Malaysian King in 2006.  It does not carry any title.

Honours of Malaysia 
  :
  Officer of the Order of the Defender of the Realm (K.M.N.) (2006)

Election results

External links

References

Living people
1955 births
People from Penang
Malaysian politicians of Chinese descent
20th-century Malaysian lawyers
Former Parti Gerakan Rakyat Malaysia politicians
Former Malaysian Chinese Association politicians
Former People's Justice Party (Malaysia) politicians
Independent politicians in Malaysia
Members of the Penang State Legislative Assembly
Members of Lincoln's Inn
Officers of the Order of the Defender of the Realm